Opdorp is one of the three towns making up the municipality of Buggenhout in East Flanders, Belgium. Sometimes it's classified in the Denderstreek.

Opdorp is at the geographical centre of Flanders, Belgium. It is also the point at which three provinces meet: Brabant, Antwerp, and East Flanders.

Opdorp developed around a triangular dries (village square). The dries contains a chapel and the village pump. The town hall, school and former monastery were built around the square.

Gallery

See also
Nil-Saint-Vincent-Saint-Martin

References

External links
 
 Official site (in Dutch)

Buggenhout
Populated places in East Flanders